Dobrin is a commune located in Sălaj County, Crișana, Romania. It is composed of six villages: Deleni (Nagymonújfalu), Doba (Nagydoba), Dobrin, Naimon (Nagymon), Sâncraiu Silvaniei (Szilágyszentkirály) and Verveghiu (Vérvölgy).

Doba Mică (Kisdoba) is a hamlet in Doba village and a former fief of the Dobai family. It features a 17th-century wooden church.

Sights 
 Wooden Church in Doba Mică, built in the 17th century, historic monument
 Wooden Church in Dobrin, built in the 18th century (1720), historic monument
 Reformed Church in Doba Mică, built in the 19th century (1830)

References

Communes in Sălaj County
Localities in Crișana